Eaddy is a surname and a given name. Notable people with the name include:

 Don Eaddy (1934–2008), American baseball, football, and basketball player
 Tahj Eaddy (born 1996), American basketball player 
 Eaddy Mays, American actress and producer

English-language surnames